El Destino Plantation was a large cotton plantation of  located in western Jefferson County and eastern Leon County, Florida, United States established by John Nuttall in 1828.

Location
El Destino was located in western Jefferson County near present-day Waukeenah.

Plantation Specifics
Improved Land: N/A
Unimproved Land: N/A
Cash value of plantation: N/A
Cash value of farm implements/machinery: N/A
Cash value of farm animals: N/A
Number of slaves: N/A

Plantation History
The land to become El Destino was purchased from the U.S. government in 1828. In 1832 William B. Nuttall bought El Destino from his father’s estate for $17,000. Nutall died leaving the property to his widow, Mary Savage Nuttall. Mary Nuttall would inherit enslaved people from her uncle, William Savage. On May 18, 1840 George Noble Jones married Mary Savage Nuttall and purchased El Destino.

Plantation House
A large beautiful home, it was destroyed by fire in 1925.

The Owners
John Nuttall was a wealthy planter from Virginia and later North Carolina.
William B. Nuttall, son of John Nuttall. William had a law office in Tallahassee and was a speculator in Florida lands and bank stocks. John died from a stroke on April 20, 1836.
George Noble Jones married Mary Nuttall and purchased El Destino as well as Chemonie Plantation in Leon County. George was well acquainted with plantation management having managed a plantation in Jefferson County owned by his mother and two aunts. Jones would inherit part of this plantation as well as considerable wharf and mercantile property in Savannah, Georgia, and bank stock and other investments. Jones would become an absentee planter preferring to spend his winter months in Savannah and the summer months in Newport, Rhode Island, where he owned a mansion called Kingscote, until the Civil War.

El Destino remained in the Jones family until 1919. It was then sold for $70,000 but kept its name. In 1937 it was purchased by Sheldon Whitehouse of New York.

Overseer
D.N. Moxley

References

Paisley, Clifton; From Cotton To Quail, University of Florida Press, c1968.
FL Historical Society

External links
Jones, George Noble. Births and Deaths on Chemonie Plantation, 1851, FL
Jones, George Noble. List of Slaves on Chemonie Plantation Who Received Clothing in 1851, FL
Jones, George Noble, Slaves on Chemonie Plantation, 1852, in Family Groups, FL
Jones, George Noble. List of Slaves on El Destino Plantation in 1847, in Family Groups, FL
Jones, George Noble. Slaves Sold to Joseph Bryan, 1860, FL

Plantations in Jefferson County, Florida
Cotton plantations in Florida
Burned buildings and structures in the United States
1828 establishments in Florida Territory